Anita Nair (born 26 January 1966) is an Indian novelist who writes her books in English. She is best known for her novels A Better Man, Mistress, and Lessons in Forgetting. She has also written poetry, essays, short stories, crime fiction, historical fiction, romance, and children's literature, including Muezza and Baby Jaan: Stories from the Quran.

Early life and education
Nair was born in Shoranur in Palakkad district of Kerala. Nair was educated in Chennai (Madras) before returning to Kerala, where she gained a BA in English Language and Literature.

Career
Nair was working as the creative director of an advertising agency in Bangalore when she wrote her first book, a collection of short stories called Satyr of the Subway, which she sold to Har-Anand Press. The book won her a fellowship from the Virginia Center for the Creative Arts . Nair's second book was published by Penguin India, and was the first book by an Indian author to be published by Picador USA.

Among Nair's early commercial works were pieces she penned in the late 1990s for The Bangalore Monthly magazine (now called Explocity Bangalore), published by Explocity in a column titled 'The Economical Epicurean'.

Thereafter followed Nair's novel The Better Man (2000) which was also published in Europe and the United States. In 2002, Ladies Coupé was elected as one of the five best in India. The novel is about women's conditions in a male dominated society, told with great insight, solidarity and humour. Nair's novels The Better Man and Ladies Coupé have been translated into 21 languages. Her 2018 novel Eating Wasps is an update to Ladies Coupé. 

In 2002, her debut collection of poems Malabar Mind was published, and in 2003 Where the Rain is Born – Writings about Kerala which she has edited.

Nair has also written The Puffin Book of Myths and Legends (2004), a children's book on myths and legends.

Nair's writings about Kerala and her poetry has been included in The Poetry India Collection and a British Council Poetry Workshop Anthology. Her poems appeared in The Dance of the Peacock: An Anthology of English Poetry from India, featuring 151 Indian English poets, edited by Vivekanand Jha and published by Hidden Brook Press, Canada.

Nair has also written other books, such as Mistress (2003), Adventures of Nonu, the Skating Squirrel (2006), Living Next Door to Alise (2007) and Magical Indian Myths (2008). Nair's works also include many travelogues. With the play Nine Faces of Being, she became a playwright, adapting the script from her book Mistress Her book Cut Like Wound (2012) introduced the fictional character Inspector Gowda. The second book in the series Chain of Custody was published in 2015. Other works by Nair include The Lilac House (2012) and Alphabet Soup for Lovers (2016).

Her sixth novel Idris: Keeper of The Light (2014) is a historical and geographical novel about a Somalian trader who visited Malabar in 1659 AD.

She has also written several audiobooks, including A Field of Flowers (2021) and Little Duck Girl, narrated by Prakash Raj. Twin Beds was voiced by Konkona Sen Sharma and Satyadeep Mishra, and she voiced the audiobooks Why I Killed My Husband and Satyr of the Subway.

In January 2022, Anita Nair was interviewed for the podcast, The Literary City with Ramjee Chandran.

Awards and recognitions
 Arch of Excellence Award by the All India Achievers' Conference, New Delhi for Literature
 2007 LiBeraturpreis, finalist, Germany.
 2008 FLO FICCI Women Achievers Award, for literature
 2009 Montblanc honored her with the launch of the Special Edition writing instrument in India; for her novel contribution to literature, enforcing cross cultural endeavors and enlightening experiences that have transcended an inexhaustible diversity of forms – barriers of language, cultures and identities.
 2012 Kerala Sahitya Akademi Award for her contribution to literature and culture
 2014 The Hindu Literary Prize shortlist for Idris Keeper of the Light
 2015 Global Ambassador for Women for Expo May
 2017 Crossword Book Award, Jury Award, Children's category, Muezza and Baby Jaan
 2020 UNHCR appointment as a high-profile supporter

Bibliography
Satyr of the Subway & Eleven Other Stories 1997, 
The Better Man New Delhi ; London : Penguin Books, 1999. , 
Ladies Coupé 2001. , 
Malabar Mind – Poetry Calicut : Yeti Books, 2002. , 
Where the Rain is Born – Writings about Kerala (Editor) 2003 
Puffin Book of World Myths and Legends 2004 
Mistress 2005. , 
Adventures of Nonu, the Skating Squirrel 2006. , 
Living Next Door To Alise 2007. , 
Magical Indian Myths 2008. , 
Goodnight & God Bless 2008. , 
Lessons in Forgetting 2010. , 
Chemmeen''' (Translator) 2011Cut Like Wound – Literary noir 2012. , The Lilac House: a novel New York : St. Martin's Griffin, 2012. , Idris – Historical novel 2014. , Alphabet soup for lovers, Noida, Uttar Pradesh, India: HarperCollins Publishers India, 2015. , Chain of custody : an inspector Gowda novel, Noida : Harper Black, 2016. , /Eating Wasps'', Context, 2018

Personal life
She lives in Bangalore with her husband, Suresh Parambath and a son.

References

External links

 Official site
 Anita's Attic – A Creative Writing Mentorship program by Anita Nair
 Eating Wasps by Anita Nair

Indian women dramatists and playwrights
Living people
People from Palakkad district
English-language writers from India
Indian women novelists
1966 births
Indian women children's writers
Indian children's writers
Indian women essayists
Indian women poets
20th-century Indian women writers
21st-century Indian women writers
20th-century Indian dramatists and playwrights
21st-century Indian dramatists and playwrights
21st-century Indian poets
20th-century Indian poets
20th-century Indian novelists
21st-century Indian novelists
Novelists from Kerala
Indian women short story writers
20th-century Indian short story writers
21st-century Indian short story writers
Women writers from Kerala
Dramatists and playwrights from Kerala